SBS Contents Hub (former SBSi) is the digital window of SBS Media Group. Its headquarters are located in Seoul, South Korea. SBSi is also affiliated with SIREN Entertainment. The current CEO of SBS Contents Hub is Lee, Nam-Ki.

Productions

Games

 "WonderKing Online"

See also 
NDOORS Corporation
WonderKing Online

References

External links
 Company Website

Contents
Film distributors of South Korea
Video game companies of South Korea
Software companies of South Korea
Video game publishers
Companies listed on KOSDAQ